Orlando Keith McDaniel (December 1, 1960 – March 27, 2020) was an American football wide receiver. He played college football for the LSU Tigers (1978–1981) and professional football for the Denver Broncos (1982). He appeared in 44 games at LSU, totaling 64 receptions for 1,184 yards and three touchdowns. Drafted by the Broncos in the second round of the 1982 NFL Draft, he appeared in only three NFL games and did not catch a pass. McDaniel died in March 2020, a victim at age 59 of the COVID-19 pandemic.

Biography
McDaniel was born in Shreveport, Louisiana, and attended Lake Charles High School in Lake Charles, Louisiana. He attended college at Louisiana State University, where he played as a wide receiver for the Tigers. At LSU, he caught 64 passes for 1,184 yards and three touchdowns over four seasons. His 17.5 yards per reception in 1981 ranked second in the Southeastern Conference, and his 719 receiving yards ranked fourth.

McDaniel also ran track, and finished second in 1980 in the NCAA Division I Outdoor Track and Field Championships – Men's 110 meter hurdles.  McDaniel was the founder and coach of the North Texas Cheetahs Track Club.

On March 27, 2020, McDaniel died of complications from COVID-19 during the COVID-19 pandemic in Texas.

References

External links
 

1960 births
2020 deaths
American football wide receivers
American male hurdlers
Denver Broncos players
LSU Tigers football players
LSU Tigers track and field athletes
Players of American football from Shreveport, Louisiana
African-American players of American football
Deaths from the COVID-19 pandemic in Texas
21st-century African-American people